Edmar Halovskyi de Lacerda (born 16 June 1980) often known as simply Edmar, born as Edmar de Lacerda Aparecida, is a retired professional footballer who played as a midfielder. Born in Brazil, he was naturalized as a Ukrainian and has played fifteen times and scored one goal for the Ukraine national football team.

Career

Club
On 21 February 2017, Boca Raton announced the signing of Edmar.

International
Edmar made his debut for Ukraine on 10 August 2011, in a 0–1 loss against Sweden in a friendly match at his club ground in Kharkiv, replacing Ruslan Rotan for the final 17 minutes.

On 7 June 2013, his third cap, he made his first start in a 4–0 away win over Montenegro in qualification for the following year's World Cup.  Edmar was one of nine Ukrainian players on 6 September to score in their 9–0 thrashing of San Marino at the Arena Lviv in another qualifier. On 15 November, he provided the pass to teammate Roman Zozulya for the first goal in a 2–0 victory over France, in the qualification play-off, although France won on aggregate.

Personal life 
He got married on 13 December 2008 in Simferopol to Ukrainian Tetiana Halovska, a native of Simferopol Raion.

As a naturalized Ukrainian citizen, on 20 July 2014, Edmar was called up to the Ukraine Army during the conflict with Russia.

Career statistics

International

Statistics accurate as of match played 12 October 2014

International goals

References

External links

Edmar's profile at Metalist's web page
Edmar's interview with Lviv Newspaper
Edmar Aparecida profile at the Brazilian FA database
Edmar Lacerda's football career story from O Globo Esporte in Brazil
 

1980 births
Living people
People from Mogi das Cruzes
Ukrainian footballers
Ukraine international footballers
Brazilian footballers
Association football midfielders
Paulista Futebol Clube players
Sport Club Internacional players
FC Metalist Kharkiv players
SC Tavriya Simferopol players
FC Dnipro players
FC Metalist 1925 Kharkiv players
Brazilian expatriate footballers 
Brazilian expatriate sportspeople in Ukraine

Expatriate footballers in Ukraine 
Ukrainian Premier League players
Ukrainian Second League players
Brazilian emigrants to Ukraine 
Ukrainian people of Brazilian descent
Naturalized citizens of Ukraine 
Ukrainian expatriate footballers
Expatriate soccer players in the United States
Ukrainian expatriate sportspeople in the United States
Brazilian expatriate sportspeople in the United States
Boca Raton FC players
Footballers from São Paulo (state)
Ukrainian football managers
FC Metalist 1925 Kharkiv managers
Ukrainian Premier League managers
Ukrainian military personnel of the war in Donbas
Territorial Defense Forces of Ukraine personnel